Dean's Ravine Falls is a  waterfall formed along Reed Brook in Canaan, Connecticut. The falls were once a "must-see" spot along the 2,180-mile-long Appalachian Trail, until the trail was rerouted west of the Housatonic River through Sharon, Connecticut in the early 1980s. Today, it can be accessed via The Mohawk Trail from a parking area located at the intersection of Music Mountain Road and Cream Hill Road.

References 

Canaan, Connecticut
Landforms of Litchfield County, Connecticut
Waterfalls of Connecticut